Simão Paulo (born 6 April 1966) is an Angolan footballer. He played in two matches for the Angola national football team in 1994 and 1995. He was also named in Angola's squad for the 1996 African Cup of Nations tournament.

References

1966 births
Living people
Angolan footballers
Angola international footballers
1996 African Cup of Nations players
Association football goalkeepers
Footballers from Luanda